Anubhuti Residential School an ICSE affiliated School based in Jalgaon, Maharashtra, India. The school stands in the top 10 list of ISC residential schools. It is a co-educational residential school.

The School is affiliated to the CISCE (Council for Indian School Certificate Examination), New Delhi which conducts the ICSE (Class 10) & ISC (Class 12) examinations.

School is located near by  Jain Irrigation's Jain Hills, Jain Valley and  Gandhi Research Foundation.  Founded by visionary Founder Chairman Bhavarlal Jain through Bhavarlal and Kantabai Jain Multipurpose Foundation.

Medium of Learning

As required by the CISCE, the medium of instruction is English. Marathi and Hindi are integral to the curriculum. They are offered as second/third languages.

Recently this school achieved some awards like Green School award, prestigious Wipro Earthian Award, AICA (Artist in Concrete) Awards for architectural construction in the field of education.

References

External links 
 Official Anubhuti School Website

Boarding schools in Maharashtra
Education in Jalgaon
Schools by association